The Iceland women's national under-18 basketball team is a national basketball team of Iceland, administered by the Icelandic Basketball Federation.
It represents the country in women's international under-18 basketball competitions.

The team won a gold medal at the 2003 European Promotion Cup for Junior Women.

See also
Iceland women's national basketball team
Iceland women's national under-16 basketball team
Iceland men's national under-18 basketball team

References

External links
Archived records of Iceland team participations

Basketball in Iceland
Women's national under-18 basketball teams
Women's national sports teams of Iceland